Seth Amoo (born 20 March 1983) is a Ghanaian sprinter who specializes in the 200 metres.

Amoo represented Ghana at the 2008 Summer Olympics in Beijing. He competed at the 200 metres and placed fourth in his first round heat in a time of 20.91 seconds, which was not enough to qualify for the second round.

Competition record

Personal bests
60 metres - 6.70 s (2008)
100 metres - 10.30 s (2004)
200 metres - 20.36 s (2005)
400 metres - 46.08 s (2003)

References

External links

1983 births
Living people
Ghanaian male sprinters
Commonwealth Games competitors for Ghana
Athletes (track and field) at the 2006 Commonwealth Games
Athletes (track and field) at the 2008 Summer Olympics
Olympic athletes of Ghana
African Games silver medalists for Ghana
African Games medalists in athletics (track and field)
World Athletics Championships athletes for Ghana
Athletes (track and field) at the 2007 All-Africa Games